What It Is is the sixth studio album by American musician Hayes Carll. It was released on February 15, 2019, through Dualtone Records.

Critical reception

What It Is has been given a Metacritic score of 79 based on 9 reviews, indicating generally favorable reviews.

Commercial performance
The album has sold 11,800 copies in the United States as of March 2020.

Track listing

Charts

References

2019 albums
Hayes Carll albums
Dualtone Records albums